This is a list of events in Scottish television from 1998.

Events

January to April
No events.

May
31 May – Sky Scottish closes after just over eighteen months on air, because the channel fails to meet its financial targets.

June
No events.

July
29 July – British Digital Broadcasting rebrand as ONdigital.

August
No events.

September
23 September – BBC Choice, the UK's first digital-only TV station, launches. The channel broadcasts around two hours each night of programming for Scotland as an opt-out from the main channel.

October
1 October – Digital satellite television launches in the UK, operated by Sky Digital. This sees the start of UK channels transmitting in 16:9 widescreen.

November
No events.

December
11 December – BBC governors reject a request to give Scotland its own Six O'Clock News bulletin. Instead an extra £20m will be spent on new jobs and programming in Scotland, Wales and Northern Ireland.

Debuts

BBC
Unknown – Looking After Jo Jo (1998)

Television series
Scotsport (1957–2008)
Reporting Scotland (1968–1983; 1984–present)
Scotland Today (1972–2009)
Sportscene (1975–present)
The Beechgrove Garden (1978–present)
Grampian Today (1980–2009)
High Road (1980–2003)
Taggart (1983–2010)
Crossfire (1984–2004)
Wheel of Fortune (1988–2001)
Fun House (1989–1999)
Win, Lose or Draw (1990–2004)
Machair (1993–1999)
Telefios (1993–2000)
Only an Excuse? (1993–2020)

Ending this year
7 December – McCallum (1995–1998)
24 December – The Baldy Man (1995–1998)
Unknown – Top Club (1971–1998)

See also
1998 in Scotland

References

 
Television in Scotland by year
1990s in Scottish television